Sandow Power Plant was a 1.1-gigawatt (1,137 MW) coal power plant located southwest of Rockdale, Texas in Milam County, Texas. It was operated by Luminant, a subsidiary of Vistra Corp. The plant closed in 2018.

Sandow Power Plant Units 1–3
Sandow was constructed by Alcoa in 1951 to power its nearby aluminium smelting facility. Operations of Sandow's first three units began in 1954 with a nearby reservoir called Alcoa Lake utilized to cool the plant. In the 1980s, Alcoa commenced a mid-life update to Units 1–3 at a cost of $63 million. After its completion, pollution from the plant increased by 13,000 tons annually.  A settlement with the Environmental Protection Agency (EPA) was agreed upon in 2003 to remedy the plant for violating the Clear Air Act. Ultimately, Units 1–3 would be decommissioned in 2009.

Sandow Power Plant Units 4–5
The plant had two active units at the time of its closure: Unit 4 began operation in 1981 and Unit 5 began operation in 2009.  The power plant used lignite from the Sandow mine in Rockdale until 2006, when Three Oaks Mine in nearby Bastrop County, Texas opened. Unit 4 was retrofitted with a selective catalytic reduction (SCR) system by Fluor in 2008 to reduce nitrogen oxide emissions. Transmission of electricity to the nearby aluminum smelter stopped in 2008 when Alcoa ceased smelting operations at its Rockdale facility and accused Luminant of power supply issues. It was announced on October 13, 2017 that Luminant would shut down Sandow Power Plant in early-2018 due to economic factors such as low natural gas prices and growth in renewable energy. The Electric Reliability Council of Texas (ERCOT) approved of the shut down the following month.  ERCOT found the plant was "not required to support ERCOT transmission system reliability," and closed by January 11, 2018.

See also

 List of power stations in Texas

References

External links
Luminant page for Sandow Power Plant

Energy infrastructure completed in 1954
Energy infrastructure completed in 1981
Energy infrastructure completed in 2009
Buildings and structures in Milam County, Texas
Former coal-fired power stations in Texas
1954 establishments in Texas
2018 disestablishments in Texas
Vistra Corp